The 1939 Fresno State Bulldogs football team represented Fresno State Normal School—now known as California State University, Fresno—as a member of the California Collegiate Athletic Association (CCAA) and Far Western Conference (FWC) during the 1939 college football season. Led by fourth-year head coach James Bradshaw, Fresno State compiled an overall record of 10–1 with a mark of 1–1 in CCAA, playing second behind conference champion San Jose State. The Bulldogs were also 2–0 in FWC play, but did not play enough league game to qualify for the conference title. Fresno State  outscored its opponents 244 to 98 for the season. The team played home games at Fresno State College Stadium on the campus of Fresno City College in Fresno, California.

Schedule

References

Fresno State
Fresno State
Fresno State Bulldogs football seasons
Fresno State Bulldogs football